The Sword Bearer is a 2006 Russian superhero thriller films directed by Filipp Yankovsky, based on Yevgeni Danilenko's book of the same name.

Plot summary
Sasha walks through his life, leaving a bloody trace behind him. He is chased after. But evil be to the pursuer who will manage to draw up with him. The older he grows, the more he becomes a rectification tool against injustice. The more appalling is a crime, the more dreadful is his punishment. Shocking and unfathomable events slash the tissue of present-day reality.

Gradually Sasha becomes too dangerous to live among people, and one day the entire world revolts against him. He possesses a supernatural power, enabling him to destroy everything on his way. SHE makes her sudden appearance on his way. Ignorant of his supernatural powers, she falls in love with him.

Cast
 Artyom Tkachenko as Sasha
 Chulpan Khamatova as Katya
 Alexey Gorbunov as Klim
 Tatyana Lyutaeva as Bella
 Leonid Gromov as Roshin
 Aleksei Zharkov as  father
 Nadezhda Markina as  Sasha's mother

References

External links

 Trailer of Sword Bearer
 Trailer and Screenshots

2006 films
2000s Russian-language films
Russian superhero films
Russian action thriller films
Russian romantic thriller films
Russian science fiction thriller films
Films directed by Filipp Yankovsky